Nimio de Anquín (1896–1979) was an Argentine Thomist writer and fascist politician. Seeking to combine European models of fascism with his own attachment to the Catholic Church he led several movements and for a time had a strong following. Subsequently, however, he lost political influence and his later life was mainly focused on his academic career.

Early years
A native of Córdoba, Argentina, de Anquín studied law at National University of Córdoba. With his studies in Argentina completed he travelled to Germany to study philosophy under Ernst Cassirer. Whilst in Europe he developed his interest in politics and became a follower of the ideas of Charles Maurras after coming into contact with his work. Soon de Anquín sought to develop his own political ideas by seeking to combine Thomism with Hegelianism, leading him to call for a national syndicalist state.

Fascist leader
He was a founder of the Instituto San Tomas de Aquino in Córdoba, Argentina in 1929 and this group would become linked to the Argentine Fascist Party. In 1934 he joined the Fascismo Argentino de Córdoba (Blueshirts). By the following year he had taken over as leader of the group, which by then had changed its name to the Frente de Fuerzas Fascistas in 1935. Various groups then merged in 1936 to emerge as the Union National Fascista under de Anquin's leadership. A strong admirer of Benito Mussolini and Italian fascism, he argued that Argentine nacionalismo should follow the Italian model by seeking to mobilise mass support but that the domestic version of fascism should put a stronger emphasis on the centrality of Catholicism to national identity than its European counterparts.

However de Anquín found it difficult to lead the fascist movement in the face of opposition. In 1934 he was suspended from his lectureship at the Colegio Nacional de Monserrat, in Córdoba, due to the violence of his movement. The violence continued however until active repression began in late 1936 when he attempted to force university students to sign a letter in support of Francisco Franco. By 1939 the Union National Fascista was effectively moribund.

Later years
With his movement now defunct de Anquín returned to lecturing, initially in his home town then later in Santa Fe. He did not abandon politics altogether however and became associated with the journals Sol y Luna and Nueva Politica and, on a more religious note, the group of intellectuals around Marcelo Sánchez Sorondo. He also wrote in praise of Adolf Hitler stating in 1941 that "by the work of the great Hitler, liberalism and ugly democracy have died". He continued to write on political matters until late in his life, inevitably focusing on his two favoured themes of militant nationalism and anti-democracy.

References

1896 births
1979 deaths
People from Córdoba, Argentina
National University of Córdoba alumni
Argentine fascists
Argentine male writers
Thomists
National syndicalists
Christian fascists
Catholicism and far-right politics
Fascist politicians